Pittosporum eriocarpum is a plant species of the Indian subcontinent in the Pittosporaceae family, native to Himachal Pradesh and Uttar Pradesh. This taxon is threatened by habitat loss.

References

eriocarpum
Flora of West Himalaya
Flora of Uttar Pradesh
Endangered plants
Taxonomy articles created by Polbot